Jorge Horacio Serna Castañeda (born 27 October 1979) is a Colombian former professional footballer who played as a forward. His past clubs include Independiente Medellín (Colombia), Peñarol (Uruguay), Colo-Colo (Chile), Atlético Paranaense (Brazil) and Mineros de Guayana (Venezuela). He made four appearances scoring one goal for the Colombia national team between 1999 and 2002.

Club career
Serna was born in Medellín, Colombia.

In June 2010, Serna returned to former club Envigado after his contract with Brazilian side Atlético Paranaense had been rescinded. He signed a six-month contract.

Honours
Independiente Medellín
Categoría Primera A: 2004-I

Individual
Goalscorer Categoría Primera A: 2001

Notes

References

External links
 
 
 
 GolGolGol (Colombian soccer official website)  

1979 births
Living people
Association football forwards
Colombian footballers
Footballers from Medellín
Colombia international footballers
Águilas Doradas Rionegro players
Independiente Medellín footballers
Como 1907 players
Peñarol players
Colo-Colo footballers
Real Jaén footballers
Caracas FC players
Deportes Tolima footballers
S.D. Quito footballers
Club Alianza Lima footballers
Envigado F.C. players
Club Athletico Paranaense players
A.C.C.D. Mineros de Guayana players
Atlético Huila footballers
Deportes Quindío footballers
Fortaleza C.E.I.F. footballers
Categoría Primera A players
Uruguayan Primera División players
Peruvian Primera División players
Chilean Primera División players
Serie A players
Segunda División B players
Colombian expatriate footballers
Colombian expatriate sportspeople in Italy
Expatriate footballers in Italy
Colombian expatriate sportspeople in Uruguay
Expatriate footballers in Uruguay
Colombian expatriate sportspeople in Chile
Expatriate footballers in Chile
Colombian expatriate sportspeople in Ecuador
Expatriate footballers in Ecuador
Colombian expatriate sportspeople in Peru
Expatriate footballers in Peru
Colombian expatriate sportspeople in Brazil
Expatriate footballers in Brazil
Colombian expatriate sportspeople in Venezuela
Expatriate footballers in Venezuela
Colombian expatriate sportspeople in Guatemala
Expatriate footballers in Guatemala